Francis R. Cody (born June 13, 1948) is an American record producer, A&R and radio executive. Described by the R&R Magazine and The New York Times as "Smooth Jazz's Leading Alchemist" and "The Father of Smooth Jazz",

Background
Cody is widely known for the development of Los Angeles-based pioneer Smooth Jazz radio station KTWV (94.7 MHz) "The WAVE". At various times, Cody has served as an executive at NBC, ABC and been a co-founder/CEO of research/consulting firm Broadcast Architecture, later owned by Clear Channel. Along with music industry veteran Hyman Katz and multi Grammy-nominated RIAA Gold-certified recording artist Dave Koz, Cody has founded record label Rendezvous Entertainment, releasing records by Wayman Tisdale, Jonathan Butler, Philippe Saisse, Svoy, earning Grammy Awards for Patti Austin and Kirk Whalum.

References

1948 births
Living people
American record producers
American radio executives